Furkan Bayır (born 9 February 2000) is a Turkish professional soccer player who plays as a centre-back for Süper Lig club Alanyaspor.

Professional career
Bayır began his senior career with Menemenspor, and moved to Alanyaspor on 2 January 2021 - he was loaned back to Menemenspor for the remainder of the 2020–21 season. He made his professional debut with Alanyaspor in a 1-1 Süper Lig tie with İstanbul Başakşehir on 8 January 2022.

International career
Bayır is a youth international for Turkey, having been called up to represent the Turkey U21s in June 2021.

References

External links
 

2000 births
Living people
Footballers from İzmir
Turkish footballers
Turkey under-21 international footballers
Süper Lig players
TFF First League players
TFF Second League players
Alanyaspor footballers
Association football defenders